George Lubega Timothy (born 8 June 1990) is a Ugandan singer known by his stage name Exodus. He made his musical debut in 2004 with his hit single "Ganja Man".

Early life 

Exodus was raised by a single mother, who died when he was 10 years old. He was then taken in until he was 12 years old by his polygamous father. Exodus had to join the streets of Kampala after being rejected by his physically and mentally abusive father.
At age 12 in 1996, he started feeding in dustbins, smoking marijuana, sniffing petrol and pickpocketing for a living around Katwe, Dewinton road and Owino market which was his base. In 2001, he left the streets for Nakulabye in Kiyaaye where together with a friend, Dan Kimuli, began a new life.

It was Kimuli who suggested that he visit pastor Robert Kayanja's Miracle Centre church. "I wanted to taste this Jesus that was preached that day, and the following week I went back and gave my life to Jesus" said Exodus in an interview. His first hit as a solo artist "Once a Ganja Man" narrates the journey of his life on the streets of Kampala to his transformation as a follower of Christ. In "Once a Ganja man" he narrates, "Remember the days of Ganja, when we used to smoke Ganja" This single became an anthem in churches, conferences and even at secular concerts. The Once a ganja man single became so massive and it got huge airplay on radio and Television stations worldwide. At his age, his first serious single managed to get airplay on MTV base yet those that joined the industry years back and even have the funds to facilitate their projects have failed to have their songs played on MTV. With just one song, Exodus won several awards from religious organisations and Buzz Magazine.

Music career 

After meeting Pastor Kayanja in 2002, in 2004 he became a leader and singer in the church choir. It is the same year that Isaac Rucibigango (Rucci) recruited Exodus and two others, Bahati Nsereko and Kenneth Tusubira, to form the Sauti band that toured the Great Lakes region.

He toured Tanzania, Rwanda and Kenya. While in Kenya in 2007, he left Sauti. In 2008, he released his first song Ganjaman. The song later became very big and it took over Uganda and beyond. He followed that single with Addicted, I am Walking and his biggest hit yet, Igwe. He is now working on his first 12-track album. With only four songs under his belt, Exodus has been nominated for, and won more awards than many musicians who have been in the field much longer.
In 2009, he was nominated for an MTV Africa Music Awards and won four Buzz teen awards. He has also won the Groove awards based in Nairobi, Pearl of Africa Music Awards; won two Olive gospel awards and was nominated in the All Africa Gospel Music awards in London as one of Africa's best gospel artistes.

Charity 

Exodus works as the Artistic Director and Peace Ambassador of the Irene Gleeson Foundation (IGF) based in Northern Uganda. IGF is a charitable organisation taking care of more than 10,000 ex-child soldiers. On 19 August 2012, Exodus held a concert in Kampala, Uganda, in the Victoria hall of Serena Hotel to raise money to support the children of IGF. Exodus performed with featuring artists such as Isaiah Katumwa, Maurice Kirya, Isaac Rucci, G Way, Hum Kay and Tabu Flo. All the proceeds went to the Foundation.

Personal life 

Exodus is married to Brenda Mwanje.

Awards and nominations

External links 
 Official Instagram
YouTube Channel

References 

21st-century Ugandan male singers
1984 births
Living people